Alexander Nikolaevich Kolminov (Александр Николаевич Хо́лминов; 8 September 1925 —  26 November 2015), PAU, was a Soviet and Russian composer.

He is best known for the Soviet opera An Optimistic Tragedy based on the play of the same name by Vsevolod Vishnevsky. The role of the commissar was created by Anna Arkhipova.

Operas
An Optimistic Tragedy (Optimisticheskaya tragediya) 1965, after the play by Vishnevsky
Anna Snegina (1967), after the poem by Sergey Esenin

References

1925 births
Russian composers
Russian male composers
Place of birth missing
2015 deaths